is an action massively multiplayer online role-playing game (MMORPG) by CyberStep. It is set in a fantasy land reminiscent of ancient Japan in which humans and non-humans such as Oni and other Yōkai coexist. The game was originally released in Japan on February 6, 2014 and in North America on July 1, 2014. The English console versions were released on October 2, 2015 for the Xbox One, on October 6, 2015 for the PlayStation 4 and January 31, 2019 for Nintendo Switch. The game's title means "oni cutter", reflective of the player characters' background as an Oni; the title can also be taken as a pun on onigiri, the Japanese rice ball.

Plot
The game is set in a fantasy version of ancient Japan that is filled with creatures of myth. Ages ago, the terrible Kamikui made a trail of death and destruction across the land before being stopped by the goddess of the Sun, Amaterasu Oomikami. The goddess placed three great Seals that forced Kamikui to retreat. Now, one of the Seals has shattered.

The player character is an Oni whose peaceful life in the Western island of Onigashima is disturbed by the revival of the Kamikui.

Gameplay
The game has different servers for the PC, Xbox One, Nintendo Switch, and PS4 versions but the gameplay is the same for all versions.

Unlike most other MMORPGs, which have different races or classes, in Onigiri, players can only play as Oni and choosing a class simply requires the player to pick a favored weapon to specialize in. When creating a character, players choose one of five traits that will determine which weapons they can use. The traits are Power (Axe, Oodachi, Spear, or Sword), Defensive (Spear or Staff), Kind (Staff or Wand), Daring (Axe, Oodachi, Dual Swords, Bow, or Sword), and Cautious (Dual Swords, Bow, or Wand). Characters level up five basic stats: Power, Vitality, Wisdom, Mind, and Dexterity.

Partner System
In Onigiri, players have eight NPC partners, who have distinct personalities and abilities; these can be improved as they gain more affection for the player. Affection levels can be raised by giving the companions gifts that they prefer.

Characters

Main characters

Voiced by: Aina Suzuki (Japanese); Cynthia Martinez (English)
A princess of the shogunate who has a large mansion in Edo. She runs away from home because of the strict discipline that she has had to undergo as a princess since she was little. She uses a bow and arrows as her weapon.

Voiced by: Eriko Matsui (Japanese); Stephanie Wittels (English)
A girl who is strict to others, but even stricter to herself. Usually a person with common sense, she becomes irrational on matters involving Shizuka Gozen, a relative of hers and the one exception to her otherwise all-encompassing disciplinary traits (as Yoshitsune does like to spoil Shizuka Gozen). Yoshitsune was tasked by Bakufu with the responsibility of suppressing evil spirits. She acts cute when drunk, which Kijimuna points out is even cuter than Veronica. She uses a katana as her weapon.

Voiced by: Suzuko Mimori (Japanese); Brittney Karbowski (English)
The daughter of the Oni who runs the Nagare tavern. She drinks sake three times as much as she eats rice, with her favourite sake being matatabi. She has a cheerful personality, and loves to do foolish things with her friends. Even though she runs a bar, she is always drunk (as pointed out by Shizuka Gozen). Her weapon of choice is a sword in the shape of a cat's paw.

Voiced by: Izumi Kitta (Japanese); Kira Vincent-Davis (English)
An enigmatic girl whose deeds, words, thoughts, and origins are unknown to those around her. Her hobbies include surfing the internet and reading "large-electron tile block print" (electronic newspapers). In her free time, she can be found posting fresh threads on the internet or trolling. She wears an eyepatch, and suffers from chunibyo.

Voiced by: Natsuko Hara (Japanese); Hilary Haag (English)
Formerly the sun goddess who sealed Kamikui in the past, Amaterasu Oomikami herself, Amaterasu was turned into a little girl when a large barrier got destroyed a few years ago. She likes that she can conduct herself well in her little girl form.

Secondary characters

Voiced by: Yuki Nakashima (Japanese); Margaret McDonald (English)
A boy who used the power of Kamikui to take on the appearance of a girl in order to take part in "Her Party", becoming the so-called "male daughter". His physical prowess is limited, but he has a high intellect, being a genius scientist. He always tries to stop Shizuka Gozen's partying with his dubious inventions. His name is always read in full. He hates anyone who is cuter than he is. His affection towards Susanoo (which becomes apparent during Kaga missions) implies that he is a homosexual crossdresser.

Voiced by: Monya Nakane (Japanese); Joanne Bonasso (English)
"Her Party"'s symbolic goddess, who is, in actuality, a real goddess, Ame-no-Uzume-no-Mikoto. Although she is a good-hearted goddess with twisted personality, she hates the unnatural existence of Veronica Vasilyevna Vonitsky as a "male daughter". Initially seeming to hate Shizuka Gozen, she falls in love with Shizuka after an incident where both of them get drunk.

Voiced by: Nozomi Kishita (Japanese); Tiffany Grant (English)
Seemingly a Yōkai who originally is a tree brimming with curiosity. For Kijimuna, it is lethal to not say Veronica Vasilyevna Vonitsky's name properly. Alongside Uzume and Veronica, Kijimuna is secretly on a journey to get the shogun's hidden treasure. He has a habit of saying "muna" at the end of its sentence. A running gag revolves around Kijimuna giving experience and coins upon dying, which is taken advantage of by the other characters.
, stylized as Zin in the anime
The only male in Shizuka Gozen's party, he is with Sakura when they get separated. Since Onigiri only has female voices, his dialogue is always written ADV-style, like in visual novels.

Voiced by: Suzuko Mimori (Japanese); Chaney Moore (English)
The descendant of an Oni who once lived in Onigashima, but is now separated from this world. Since Onigashima is now crowded due to being a popular tourist destination, Sakura lives her daily life just by training herself. Along with fellow Oni descendants Jin and Shizuka Gozen, she travels to destroy the Kamikuis.

Other characters
Narrator
Voiced by: Katsuyuki Konishi (Japanese); Jay Hickman (English)
The narrator of the story, who provides the background story of each episode, and mostly acts as the straight man to Shizuka Gozen's party.

Voiced by: Tiffany Terrell (English)

Voiced by: Juliet Simmons (English)
A Kamikui who turned into a human with memory loss. She remembers her past later on.

Voiced by: Shanae'a Moore (English)

Voiced by: Carolyn Medrano (English)

Voiced by: Rachel Landon (English)

Voiced by: Heather Spiller (English)

Miroku
Uses a spear. Appears only in the game and related promotional materials.
Momotarou
Uses a pair of katana. He is often hungry. Appears only in the game and related promotional materials.
Susanoo
Amaterasu's brother. Uses a large sword shaped like flames. Appears only in the game and related promotional materials.

Reception
Onigiri has garnered a number of favorable reviews. Bradly Storm of Hardcore Gamer felt that it was "a fairly competent and enjoyable hack-and-slash experience" even though the launch suffered from server-side latency issues. Reviewer Angelique Stokes praised the game's combat and wrote that the game was "bursting with personality." Sheattack's Charnelle Schindel found the plot "lackluster" but overall she felt Onigiri was generally "great fun to play." Crunchyroll called it "a very solid title."

On the other hand, many players have criticized the game for its monotony after reaching a certain level. The game creators have tried to address it by adding more high level content, event exclusive items, as well as collaboration events with other Intellectual Properties. Recently, the English PC server has raised the player level cap to level 135. No players have reached the new cap yet (as of January 2018).

Other media

Anime
An anime television adaptation of the game was announced by CyberStep on January 27, 2016. It aired from April 7, 2016 on Tokyo MX and BS Fuji then finished on June 30, 2016. Pierrot+ produced the anime with Takashi Yamamoto directing the series, Takamitsu Kouno handling series composition, Takashi Aoshima and Atsushi Oka writing the scripts. Yukiko Ibe designed the characters and is the series' chief animation director.

Sentai Filmworks has licensed the series for North America.

The opening theme is "Hime wa Rankiryuu☆Goikkou-sama" (姫は乱気流☆御一行様, The Princess is Turbulence☆Her Party) by STARMARIE.

Episode list

References

External links
 Official Onigiri website
 Official CyberStep website
  
 

Active massively multiplayer online games
Massively multiplayer online role-playing games
2014 video games
Action role-playing video games
Fantasy massively multiplayer online role-playing games
Free-to-play video games
Multiplayer online games
Anime television series based on video games
Fantasy anime and manga
Pierrot (company)
PlayStation 4 games
PlayStation Vita games
Sentai Filmworks
Video games developed in Japan
Video games with isometric graphics
Windows games
Xbox One games